Nicholas Dukagjini was a 15th-century member of the Dukagjini family.

Biography 
Nicholas Dukagjini was the son of Gjergj (George) Dukagjini, who died before 1409 when Nicholas was mentioned for the first time as the landlord of two villages near Lezhë (Alessio) and the commander of a 140 men troop (40 cavalry and 100 infantry). Nicholas' name appears in documents of 1409.

He participated in Albanian Revolt of 1432–1436 led by Gjergj Arianiti, during which he succeeded in regaining the territory held by his family before the Ottoman conquest of Albania. He even managed to capture Dagnum which he promptly granted to Venice. Unwilling to provoke the Ottomans, Venice returned Dagnum to Ottoman control in 1435.

Nicholas Dukagjin was one of the founding members of League of Lezhë, a military alliance of some members of the Albanian nobility forged in Lezhë on 2 March 1444 by:

 Lekë Zaharia (lord of Sati and Dagnum), and his vassals Pal and Nicholas Dukagjini 
 Peter Spani (lord of the mountains behind Drivasto)
 Lekë Dushmani (lord of Pult)
 George Strez, John and Gojko Balšić (lords of Misia)
 Andrea Thopia with nis nephew Tanush
 Gjergj Arianiti
 Theodor Corona Musachi
 Stefan Crnojević (lord of Upper Zeta) with his three sons Ivan, Andrija and Božidar

When Nicholas Dukagjini killed Lekë Zaharia in 1444 the Venetian Republic took over control of Zaharia's former realm. Nicholas Dukagjini continued his struggle against the new authorities and managed to capture Sati and several villages without a fight. He later concluded peace with Venice and in 1446 he is recorded in Venetian archives as the "former enemy" (tunc hostis noster).

On October 4, 1448, the Albanian–Venetian War was ended when Skanderbeg and Nicholas Dukagjini signed a peace treaty with the Republic of Venice, represented by the governor of Shkodra, Paulo Loredano and a special envoy, Andrea Venerio.  According to this agreement, signed at Skanderbeg's military camp, adjacent to Alessio, Venice would keep its possessions in Albania, including Dagnum under certain conditions: The Republic had to pay to Skanderbeg an yearly sum of 1,400 ducats, some members of the League would benefit certain trade privileges etc.

Together with many other Albanian noblemen (such as Moisi Arianit Golemi, Pal Dukagjini and Hamza Kastrioti) he abandoned Skanderbeg's forces and deserted to the Ottomans. Ottomans allowed him to govern 25 villages in Debar and 7 villages in Fandi. Nicholas died before 1454.

Descendants 

Nicholas Dukagjini had two sons, Draga and Gjergj, none of whom could lead a political life, because they were both killed in 1462. Draga Dukagjini was killed from ambush by Lekë Dukagjini who first captured many Draga's villages. Only a descendant remained, Gjergj's infant son, Nicholas, who eventually entered the service of the Venetian Republic. He remained in Venetian service until 1478 when Ottoman Empire captured Kruje in (June), Drivast (September) and Alessio shortly thereafter. Nicholas Dukagjini, together with Lekë Dukagjini fled to Italy. In 1481 he returned to Albania and joined anti-Ottoman armed movement  led by Gjon Kastrioti II.

In literature 

Girolamo de Rada, an Italian writer of Italo-Albanian literature, dedicated his 1839 work Albanian Historical Songs of Serafina Thopia, Wife of Prince Nicholas Dukagjini to unfulfilled love of Serafina Thopia and Bosdare Stresa (an Albanian Romeo and Juliet). Serafina sacrificed her love to Bosdare and married Nicholas Dukagjini to help uniting southern and northern Albania to fight against the Ottomans.

References

Sources 

 
 
 
 

Nicholas
15th-century Albanian people
Albanian Roman Catholics
Medieval Albanian nobility